Lidia Patty Mullisaca (born 7 June 1969) is a Bolivian educator and politician who is the ambassador-designate of Bolivia to Paraguay. A member of the Movement for Socialism, Patty previously represented La Paz in the Chamber of Deputies, first as a substitute under  from 2015 to 2018 and later as a full member in her own right until 2020.

An ethnic Kallawaya from Charazani in the Bautista Saavedra Province, Patty started out from humble origins, working in domestic service before being employed as a rural schoolteacher. Starting from the mid-1990s, she became active in political activism and joined the Bartolina Sisa Federation, serving as the organization's provincial executive and later departmental secretary. Around this time, she joined the nascent Movement for Socialism, with which she entered electoral politics in 1999. She won her first race for a seat on the Charazani Municipal Council in 2004 and was elected to the Chamber of Deputies in 2014.

Having kept a low profile while in office, Patty gained national notoriety following the conclusion of her term. She was the principal complainant in the Coup d'état Case, which resulted in the criminal prosecution of former president Jeanine Áñez and many other military and political actors in the country's 2019 crisis. A polemic figure for her frequent denunciations of both opposition and some ruling party officials alike, Patty launched an unsuccessful bid to become ombudsman of Bolivia in 2022. Later that year, the Legislative Assembly nominated her to serve as ambassador to Paraguay, and she will assume office in 2023.

Early life and political career 
Lidia Patty was born on 7 June 1969 in the Charazani Municipality, capital district of La Paz's Bautista Saavedra Province. The region, situated in the Bolivian Yungas and straddling the border with Peru, is home to the Kallawaya, an indigenous ethnic group of which Patty is part. As with many Kallawaya, Patty is a practitioner of traditional medicine, a product of her people's historic dedication to folk healing.

Patty completed portions of her primary schooling in Charazani before moving to La Paz at age 19. She spent some time employed in domestic service before receiving the support of a social aid institute to return home and complete her education. After a few years of study, during which time she was also taught to read and write Quechua, Patty graduated as a professional in humanities. She applied that knowledge to education as a schoolteacher in the employment of SEDEGES, a local government agency.

In 1994, Patty joined the Bartolina Sisa Federation, serving as its provincial executive until 1999. Around this time, she also began making inroads into politics. Although originally a partisan of the Revolutionary Left Movement (MIR), Patty quickly grew disenfranchised with the party and resigned from its ranks within a few weeks or months of registering. "I did not agree with their ideology," she explained, "the MIR used us indigenous people; I did not want to be used." Instead, Patty turned to a less established front: the nascent Movement for Socialism (MAS-IPSP). According to one indigenous authority from the Saavedra Province, once the MAS established a presence in Charazani, Patty became a member "overnight".

In 1999, with the campaign underway for that year's municipal elections, Patty was nominated to seek a seat on the Charazani Municipal Council. She topped the MAS's electoral list in the district but failed to attain the position. Undeterred, she again contested the race in 2004 and was elected as a substitute councillor. Throughout her tenure, Patty stood out as a polemic figure, even netting herself a year-long suspension for "bad behavior" at one point, although she alleges that it was really retribution for her denunciations of economic mismanagement. Patty later challenged the suspension in court and won, forcing the municipality to pay her financial compensation.

Chamber of Deputies

Election 

Following the conclusion of her term on the municipal council, Patty remained active in party politics and union organizing, rising to become departmental secretary of the Bartolina Sisa Confederation. In 2014, the MAS nominated her to accompany  as his running mate on the party's electoral list. She agreed and was elected to represent the La Paz Department in the Chamber of Deputies. In doing so, Patty became the first female member of the Kallawaya population ever to hold a seat in parliament—one of two Kallawaya elected that cycle, together with José Mendoza. They are, collectively, the second and third Kallawaya parliamentarians, after Walter Álvarez.

Tenure 
Sworn in at the beginning of 2015, Patty spent the first three years of her term fulfilling the relatively low-profile role of a substitute deputy. That was until early 2018, when Canelas resigned from the legislature to join the executive branch as vice minister of planning and coordination. In his stead, Patty was sworn in as a primary deputy, with all the added legislative powers the role entailed. After taking office, Patty's public presence did not significantly increase, and she mostly focused her efforts on small-scale projects, such as those promoting Kallawaya culture and medicinal practices.

Following the 2019 political crisis, Patty gained increased notoriety as a staunch critic of interim president Jeanine Áñez, whom she considered partially responsible for the ouster of then-president Evo Morales. Throughout the transition process, Patty issued frequent denunciations against the president and her cabinet, criticizing everything from the government's decision to close down schools amid the COVID-19 pandemic to alleged acts of political corruption. To combat the latter, Patty presented the so-called "Rooting Law", a bill that would prevent government authorities from traveling abroad for a period of six months after leaving office. The legislation was passed into law in September 2020, despite concerns from human rights observers that it violated certain standards, such as the presumption of innocence and freedom of movement.

Patty was not nominated for reelection in the 2019 general election. Following the annulment of those results, her and other parliamentarians' terms of office were extended past their original expiration until new elections could be held; however, she was not among the select few incumbent MAS legislators included on its slate of candidates that cycle either.

Commission assignments 
 Constitution, Legislation, and Electoral System Commission
 Constitutional Development and Legislation Committee (–)
 Democracy and Electoral System Committee (–)
 Human Rights Commission
 Gender Rights Committee (–)
 Social Policy Commission
 Housing and Public Services Committee (–)

Post-parliamentary career 
Shortly after the conclusion of her parliamentary term, Patty ramped up her efforts to prosecute those she considered culpable for promoting a "coup d'état" against Morales and his government. Less than a month after leaving office, Patty filed a formal complaint with the Prosecutor's Office against a number of individuals for the crimes of conspiracy, sedition, and terrorism. "These gentlemen have to be tried; they have violated our Constitution," she stated. Although the process—dubbed the Coup d'état Case—was initially only intended to try prominent military and police personnel for their role in the 2019 crisis, it later became the catalyst for the prosecution and eventual detention of Áñez and a number of her former ministers. The process, which netted Áñez a ten-year prison sentence, remains ongoing, with Patty continuing to call for the prosecution and arrest of other opposition figures, such as Luis Fernando Camacho and former president Carlos Mesa, and even some ruling party officials, such as Adriana Salvatierra and her own ex-colleague, Manuel Canelas, whom she considered traitors for having negotiated with the opposition.

Having gained national notoriety for her role in the prosecution of Áñez, Patty announced her intention to launch a bid to become the country's human rights ombudsman. Although the selection process was under the purview of the MAS-majority Legislative Assembly, Patty's active membership within the party hampered her ability to attain the position, as all applicants were required to have been politically independent for at least the past eight years. Despite this, Patty submitted her application anyway, justifying that the MAS was not a party but a "political instrument. That instrument is made up of the Bolivian people." "If they disqualify me, it will be discrimination because the Constitution comes before the regulations," she argued. Patty formally delivered her documentation on the penultimate day of registration, announcing to her supporters her readiness "to enforce the Constitution, enforce the agreements, the laws, the norms that we have... [I] want to work closely with the people, hand in hand." Ultimately, Patty's candidacy was disqualified, mainly on account of her political partisanship, but officially due to her failure to sign her curriculum vitae.

Despite her failure to advance in the ombudsman selection race, Patty continued in the public sphere, and in December, the Senate began considering her as a possible contender for a diplomatic role. Specifically, she was nominated to become ambassador to Paraguay, a decision that drew mixed reactions, given her lack of diplomatic experience. For opposition senator Centa Rek, the nomination demonstrated "that positions in embassies are used to fill a quota from some wing of the MAS... it would be a degradation of diplomatic service. She has no career or accreditation; what role can she have in the foreign service?" For her part, Patty justified that assuming an ambassadorship did not require diplomatic experience. "I have my indigenous, native, peasant diplomacy," she stated, "aboriginal indigenous people also live in Paraguay." "You don't need people that prepare because you learn everything along the way," she added.

Electoral history

References

Notes

Footnotes

Bibliography

External links 
 Deputies profile Vice Presidency .
 Deputies profile Chamber of Deputies . Archived from the original on 19 October 2020.

1969 births
Living people
20th-century Bolivian politicians
20th-century Bolivian women politicians
21st-century Bolivian politicians
21st-century Bolivian women politicians

Bolivian domestic workers
Bolivian educators
Bolivian municipal councillors
Bolivian trade unionists

Bolivian women trade unionists
Bolivian politicians of indigenous peoples descent

Members of the Bolivian Chamber of Deputies from La Paz
Movement for Socialism (Bolivia) politicians
People from Bautista Saavedra Province
Women members of the Chamber of Deputies (Bolivia)